Karsandas Pay & Use is a 2017 Indian Gujarati-language romantic comedy film written and directed by Krishnadev Yagnik and produced by Nilay Chotai and Vaishal Shah. The film stars Mayur Chauhan, Deeksha Joshi and Hemang Shah in lead roles and was released on 19 May 2017.

Plot
The protagonist of the film is Tilok, who runs and administers a pay and use a toilet with his younger brother Sundar. Tilok and Jaya happen to develop a love at first sight equation. Jaya (Deeksha Joshi) is the eldest daughter of Chinubha and Amba among their six children. Chinubha is an auto-rickshaw driver. Slowly and gradually Tilok and Jaya's romantic equation builds up and both of them discover without even saying, that how deep affection both of them have for each other. Jaya's father discovered their love and is reluctant to accept the relationship. He has an altercation with Tilok over this, and the whole society bashes up Tilok. Tilok then challenges Jaya's father and promises to prove his importance in the society within a month.

Cast
 Mayur Chauhan as Tilok
Deeksha Joshi as Jaya
 Hemang Shah as Sundar
Jay Bhatt as Kaalubha

Production
The film was shot in various locations in Ahmedabad and Vadodara.

Release
The film released on 19 May 2017. Released in 144 theatres of Gujarat and Mumbai. The film was later released in Australia.

Soundtrack

The soundtrack of Karsandas Pay & Use consists of 3 songs composed by Kedar and Bhargav, the lyrics of which have been written by Bhargav Purohit.

Reception

Box office
The film grossed ₹4 crore and net earning was ₹2.23 crores in the first week. It rose to ₹2.48 crore the next day. It earned $14,579 from release in Australia.

Critical response 

Abhimanyu Mishra of The Times of India rated it four out of five and praised its story and direction. Jayesh Adhyaru of DeshGujarat rated it 3/5 and noted "in spite of clichéd star-crossed love story, superb performances and an amazing eye for detailing entertain us."

References

External links
 
 
Movie review on IndianFilmHistory.com

Indian romantic comedy films
Films set in Ahmedabad
Films shot in Ahmedabad
Films shot in Gujarat
2017 romantic comedy films
Films directed by Krishnadev Yagnik
2010s Gujarati-language films